Eduardo Kuno Becker Paz (born January 14, 1978) professionally known as Kuno Becker, is a Mexican actor and film director who has worked in telenovelas, Mexican and American cinema. He is best known for his portrayal of Ruben Berrizabal in Soñadoras, and Santiago Muñez in the football film Goal! and its sequels.

He also starred as Drew Ramos on the American drama series Dallas.

Early years
After obtaining a scholarship, he traveled to Europe and began his studies at the Mozarteum in the city of Salzburg, Austria, where he spent several years taking violin lessons with Ruggiero Ricci.

He is a grandnephew of legendary Mexican actress María Félix.

Career
At seventeen Kuno made the decision to set aside his career as a violinist, in order to pursue what he now considers his greatest passion, acting. He auditioned with more than 3,200 candidates and was accepted as a student at the Centro de Educación Artística (CEA) of Televisa.

At the age of nineteen, after two years of drama studies, he obtained his first role in the telenovela Para toda la vida (1996). The next year, he participated in the music video "Corazón" by Lynda Thomas, the telenovela Pueblo chico, infierno grande (with Verónica Castro and directed by José Alberto Castro), El Alma no Tiene Color (directed by Juan Osorio) Desencuentro (directed by Ernesto Alonso), Rencor Apasionado (directed by Lucero Suárez), Camila (directed by Angelli Nesma) and Soñadoras his first lead and breakthrough role. In April 2000 Becker concluded shooting the telenovela Mujeres Engañadas.

In addition to his work in television, Becker has participated in a couple theater productions. His latest theater production was in 2008 when he starred in and produced the critically acclaimed The Pillowman written by Martin McDonagh.

He appeared in the 1997 film La Primera Noche. In 2002 Becker starred in the film La Hija del caníbal alongside the Argentine actress Cecilia Roth. He later starred opposite Antonio Banderas and Emma Thompson in the drama-thriller Imagining Argentina. Becker also starred in the historical Kazakhstani epic Nomad, filmed in 2004. The production took two years to make and it hit screens in 2006. In 2005, he starred in ESL: English as a Second Language with Maria Conchita Alonso and Soledad St. Hilaire. He also landed the lead role of Santiago Munez in the Disney football feature films Goal! in 2005 and Goal! 2: Living the Dream... in 2007, which became the most well-known football films in the world. He also appeared briefly in Goal III: Taking on the World in 2009. Becker also provided his voice to Lightning McQueen in the Latin American Spanish dubbing of the Cars film series.

His most recent film projects today are El día de la unión, Ánima, 108 Costuras, Spoken Word, La Ultima Muerte, Cabeza de Buda and Panic 5 Bravo.

He worked on his debut screenplay for the Mexican film Espacio Interior, which is based on the 1985 Mexico City earthquake. He also portrayed Esteban Navarro, a recurring antagonist, in the tenth season of CSI: Miami.

Filmography

Film

Television

Theater

Music

Awards

2000 TVyNovelas Award for Best Young Lead Actor - "Mujeres engañadas"
2000 TVyNovelas Award for Best Male Revelation - "Mujeres engañadas"
2007 Premios Juventud - "Can He Act or What?" Award for "Goal! (film)" (nominated)
2008 Premios Juventud - "Can He Act or What?" Award for "Sex and Breakfast" (nominated)
2010 Premios Juventud - "Can He Act or What?" Award for "From Mexico With Love" (nominated)
2018 Arieles

References

External links

1978 births
Living people
Mexican expatriates in the United Kingdom
Mexican male film actors
Mexican male stage actors
Mexican male telenovela actors
Mexican people of German descent
Mexican violinists
Male violinists
Male actors from Mexico City
21st-century violinists
21st-century male musicians